Christianoconcha is a genus of small air-breathing land snails, terrestrial gastropod mollusks in the family Punctidae, the dot snails.

Species
Species in the genus Christianoconcha include:
 Christianoconcha quintalia

References

 
Punctidae
Taxonomy articles created by Polbot
Gastropod genera